Manuel Martin  (active in the 16th century) was a Spanish nobleman, conquistador, notary public of Asuncion, Santa Fe, and Buenos Aires during the Viceroyalty of Peru.

Biography 
Manuel Martin was born in Spain, arrived at Rio de la Plata, in the expedition of Pedro de Mendoza. He was married to a native of Asuncion. (parents Isabel, wife of Leonardo Gribeo).

References

External links 
santafe.gov.ar

Spanish colonial governors and administrators
Spanish conquistadors
People from Asunción
People from Buenos Aires